"Carry On" is a song co-written and recorded by American country music artist Pat Green.  It was released in September 2001 as the first single from the album Three Days.  The song reached #35 on the Billboard Hot Country Singles & Tracks chart.  The song was written by Green and Walt Wilkins.

Chart performance

References

2001 singles
2001 songs
Pat Green songs
Universal Records singles
Republic Records singles
Songs written by Pat Green